Gonzalo Ruiz Cerón (born 26 June 1962) is a Mexican politician affiliated with the Institutional Revolutionary Party. He served as a federal deputy of the LIX Legislature of the Mexican Congress representing Oaxaca. He previously served as municipal president of San Pedro Mixtepec and a local deputy in the Congress of Oaxaca.

References

1962 births
Living people
Politicians from Oaxaca
Institutional Revolutionary Party politicians
20th-century Mexican politicians
21st-century Mexican politicians
Members of the Congress of Oaxaca
Universidad Autónoma Agraria Antonio Narro alumni
Municipal presidents in Oaxaca
Deputies of the LIX Legislature of Mexico
Members of the Chamber of Deputies (Mexico) for Oaxaca